Calliostoma vaubani is a species of sea snail, a marine gastropod mollusk in the family Calliostomatidae.

Some authors place this taxon in the subgenus Calliostoma (Fautor)

Description
The height of the shell attains 13 mm.

Distribution
This marine species occurs off New Caledonia at a depth of about 350 m.

References

 Marshall, B. A. (1995). Calliostomatidae (Gastropoda: Trochoidea) from New Caledonia, the Loyalty Islands, and the northern Lord Howe Rise . p. in P. Bouchet (ed.). Résultats des Campagnes MUSORSTOM, Volume 14. . Mémoires du Muséum national d'Histoire naturelle, Paris. 167 : 381–458

External links
 

vaubani
Gastropods described in 1995